Alessandro De Respinis (born 13 July 1993) is an Italian professional footballer who plays as a forward for  club Catania.

Career
Born in  Magenta, De Respinis started his career in AC Milan and Novara youth sector. As a senior, in August 2012 he joined to Mantova.
After two seasons in Lega Pro Seconda Divisione for Montova, he was loaned to Serie C club Santarcangelo for two years.

In 2018, he joined to Serie D club Sondrio. He played two seasons for Sondrio.

Return to Serie C
For the 2020–21 Serie C season, he played for Pro Sesto and Piacenza.

On 10 July 2021, he signed with Vis Pesaro. On 7 July 2022, De Respinis signed with Sangiuliano, newly promoted to Serie C.

Back to Serie D
On 17 January 2023, De Respinis moved to Catania.

References

External links
 
 

1993 births
Living people
People from Magenta, Lombardy
Sportspeople from the Metropolitan City of Milan
Footballers from Lombardy
Italian footballers
Association football forwards
Serie C players
Lega Pro Seconda Divisione players
Serie D players
A.C. Milan players
Novara F.C. players
Mantova 1911 players
Santarcangelo Calcio players
Siracusa Calcio players
F.C. Lumezzane V.G.Z. A.S.D. players
Sondrio Calcio players
Pro Sesto 2013 players
Piacenza Calcio 1919 players
Vis Pesaro dal 1898 players
F.C. Sangiuliano City players
Catania S.S.D. players